Toe Tag is an American punk/thrash/hardcore band from Seattle, Washington. Formed by Blaine Cook (also from The Fartz), Alex Sibbald and Steve 'O Ring' Nelson, after leaving the early pioneering thrash metal band The Accüsed. They completed the line-up by adding Steve McVay on bass.

With the knife-wielding, toothy-grinned Martha Splatterhead at their side, Seattle's own The Accüsed carved their way into the underground music scene, by becoming one of the cornerstones of crossover music.

After its demise in the early 2000s, the band was reborn in 2004 as Toe Tag — a grittier, back-to-roots incarnation of the Splatterrock sound composed of three-fourths The Accüsed, featuring Blaine "The Wizard" Cook, Alex "Maggotbrain" Sibbald, and Steve "O'ring Nelson with good friend and musical comrade Steve "The Beast" McVay taking Alex's 4-string job, while the Maggotbrain took over 6-string duties, complete with Wah-Wah.

Singles were released and compilations were blessed with Toe Tag's presence. Toe Tag occasionally guises themselves as Martha's Revenge: The West Coast Premiere Accused Tribute Band, playing a horror-filled mix of Toe Tag originals and resurrecting Accused songs.

Following in the footsteps of bands like Venom Inc., Know, Flag, and Entombed AD – and after recruitment of Thee Slayer Hippy – Martha's Revenge now sports the moniker, The Accused AD.

Band members 
Blaine "Zippy" Cook – vocals
Alex "Maggot Brains" Sibbald – guitars
Steve "The Beast" McVay – bass
Steve "Thee Slayer Hippy" Hanford – drums

Discography 
2009: Toe Tag & World of Lies (split album)
2013: Here She Comes Again
2014: Toe Tag (re-release of just Toe Tag songs from the split with World of Lies)
2014: Hide the Knives
2017: Throat to Scroat
2019: Ghoul in the Mirror (Accused AD)

References

External links 
splatterrock.com

American thrash metal musical groups
Hardcore punk groups from Washington (state)
Punk rock groups from Washington (state)
Musical groups from Seattle
Musical quartets